Dollface is an American comedy television series created by Jordan Weiss that premiered on November 15, 2019, on Hulu. It stars Kat Dennings, Brenda Song, Shay Mitchell, and Esther Povitsky. In January 2020, Hulu renewed the series for a second season, which was released on February 11, 2022. The series was canceled in May 2022.

Premise
The series follows "a young woman who – after being dumped by her longtime boyfriend – must deal with her own imagination in order to literally and metaphorically re-enter the world of women, and rekindle the female friendships she left behind."

Cast and characters

Main

 Kat Dennings as Jules Wiley, a woman who works as a web designer at a wellness company called Woöm
 Brenda Song as Madison Maxwell, a PR expert and Jules' best friend from college who she recently reconnects with
 Shay Mitchell as Stella Cole, Jules' other best friend from college who she recently reconnects with
 Esther Povitsky as Izzy Levine, one of Jules' co-workers at Woöm who becomes friends with her

Recurring

 Beth Grant as Cat Lady, a woman with a cat's head who is a figment of Jules' imagination
 Connor Hines as Jeremy (season 1), Jules' ex-boyfriend
 Brianne Howey as Alison B., one of Jules' co-workers at Woöm
 Vella Lovell as Alison S. (season 1), one of Jules' co-workers at Woöm
 Malin Åkerman as Celeste, the CEO of Woöm
 Goran Visnjic as Colin (season 1), Madison's older boyfriend who is a doctor and Celeste's husband
 Matthew Gray Gubler as Wes, a veterinarian and Jules' potential love interest
 Jayson Blair as Liam (season 2), Izzy's new love interest and senior brand director at a company called Saaqq
 Lilly Singh as Liv (season 2), the owner of Frank Ginatra's Cocktail Lounge, Stella's new love interest, and a single mother with a young son
 Santina Muha as Sky (season 2), a new Woöm employee
 Owen Thiele as Q (season 2), a new Woöm employee
 Luke Cook as Fender (season 2), a musician who becomes Jules' new love interest; his real name is Josh
 Corinne Foxx as Ruby (season 2), an A&R executive and a friend from college who Jules feels uneasy about

In addition, Lincoln Reichel co-stars as Bruno, Liv's young son, for the second season.

Guest
 Dave Coulier as himself (season 1)
 Este Haim as Lemon (season 1), Stella's photographer friend
 Shelley Hennig as Ramona (season 1), Jeremy's sister
 Joey Lawrence as himself (season 1)
 Ritesh Rajan as Thomas (season 1), a food and culture reporter
 Tia Carrere as Teresa (season 1), Stella's mother
 Michael Angarano as Steve (season 1), a stripper
 Camilla Belle as Melyssa (season 1), Jeremy's date
 Macaulay Culkin as Dan Hackett (season 1), a man Stella met on a previous vacation; Madison accuses him of being the Bread Bowl Killer
 Derek Theler as Ryan (season 1), a man Jules has a fling with
 Ben Lawson as Oliver (season 1), a photographer Stella house-sits for
 Margot Robbie as Imelda (season 1), a spiritual guide
 Christina Pickles as Silvia Goldwyn (season 1), a feminist icon
 Nikki Reed as Bronwyn (season 1), an old friend of Stella's
 Shelby Rabara as Lucy (season 2), Wes' ex-girlfriend
 Poppy Liu as Lotus Dragon Bebe (season 2), an erotic content creator who becomes Madison's first client
 Iliza Shlesinger as herself (season 2)
 Michaela Conlin as Delphine (season 2)
 Chelsea Frei as Alison J. (season 2), the brand director at Alison B. and Alison S.'s lifestyle company
 Gilles Marini as Richard (season 2)
 Nathan Owens as Max (season 2)
 Rozzi as herself (season 2)
 Bleached as themselves (season 2)
 Jennifer Grey as Sharon Wiley (season 2), Jules' mother
 Chris Williams as Andre (season 2), Ruby's father
 Colton Haynes as Lucas (season 2), Bruno's father
 Don Stark as Craig Wiley (season 2), Jules' father
 Phantogram as themselves (season 2)

Episodes

Series overview

Season 1 (2019)

Season 2 (2022)

Production

Development
On November 17, 2017, it was announced that Hulu had given the production a pilot order. The series was created by Jordan Weiss who was also expected to write for the series and serve as an executive producer alongside Stephanie Laing, Margot Robbie, Brett Hedblom, Bryan Unkeless, Scott Morgan, Nicole King, and Kat Dennings. In addition to producing, Laing was also set to direct the pilot episode as well. Production companies slated to be involved with the series included LuckyChap Entertainment and Clubhouse Pictures.

On November 2, 2018, it was announced that Hulu had given the production a series order for a first season consisting of ten episodes. Additional executive producers were reported to include Ira Ungerleider, Tom Ackerley, and Matt Spicer. Ungerleider was also set to serve as the series' showrunner and Spicer as the director of the first episode, replacing the previously announced Laing. Further production companies involved with the series were now expected to include ABC Signature Studios. The series premiered on November 15, 2019. On January 17, 2020, the series was renewed for a second season. On May 10, 2022, the series was canceled after two seasons.

Casting
Alongside the pilot order announcement on November 2, 2018, it was confirmed that Kat Dennings had been cast in the production's lead role. On January 31, 2019, it was announced that Brenda Song and Lex Scott Davis had joined the main cast in leading roles. On February 19, 2019, Esther Povitsky joined the cast of the series in a lead role. On April 10, 2019, it was announced Shay Mitchell had joined the cast of the series, replacing Davis. On June 4, 2019, it was announced that Goran Visnjic would join the cast in a recurring role. In July 2021, Jayson Blair, Corinne Foxx, and Luke Cook joined the cast in recurring roles for the second season. On September 17, 2021, Chelsea Frei was cast in a recurring capacity for the second season.

Filming
Principal photography for the first season wrapped on June 25, 2019. Filming for the second season concluded on October 15, 2021.

Release
The series premiered on November 15, 2019, on Hulu in the United States, and on Crave in Canada. In selected international territories, the series premiered on Disney+ under the dedicated streaming hub Star as an original series, on March 5, 2021. On Disney+, Dollface episodes are debuting on a weekly basis. and in Latin America the series released on August 31, 2021, on Star+.
The ten-episode second season was released on February 11, 2022, on Hulu.

Reception

Audience viewership 
According to Whip Media's viewership tracking app TV Time, Dollface was the 5th most anticipated returning show of February 2022, and the 10th most watched original series across all platforms in the United States, during the week of February 13th, 2022, and the 5th during the week of February 20, 2022.

Critical response 
The first season holds an approval rating of 59% based on 27 reviews on Rotten Tomatoes, with an average rating of 5.8/10. The site's critical consensus reads: "Dollface has all of the right parts: a talented cast, a promising premise, and plenty of surreal intrigue—if only its shallow vision of feminism didn't undermine them." On Metacritic, it has a weighted average score of 54 out of 100 based on reviews from 13 critics, indicating "mixed or average reviews".

The second season has an approval rating of 56% based on 9 reviews on Rotten Tomatoes, with an average rating of 4.8/10. On Metacritic, it has a weighted average score of 49 out of 100 based on reviews from 4 critics, indicating "mixed or average reviews".

Accolades

Notes

References

External links
 
 

2010s American LGBT-related comedy television series
2020s American LGBT-related comedy television series
2019 American television series debuts
2022 American television series endings
English-language television shows
Hulu original programming
Television series by ABC Signature Studios
Television shows filmed in Los Angeles
Television shows set in Los Angeles